The reign of Yuanjia was a period in Chinese history under the Liu Song dynasty which was comparatively wealthy and stable compared to previous and later periods. It occurred under the diligent Emperor Wen of the Liu Song dynasty, who was an able administrator. Under his administration, most of China enjoyed a period of relative tranquility and calm in the unstable period of the Six Dynasties.

References
Book of Song.

Liu Song dynasty
Reigns